Aaron Rostenbach Boone (born January 13, 1978) is a former American professional gridiron football wide receiver. He played college football at Kentucky. He was originally signed as an undrafted free agent by the Dallas Cowboys of the National Football League (NFL) in 2003.

In his career, Boone has also played for the Chicago Bears, Carolina Panthers, Berlin Thunder (NFL Europe), Philadelphia Soul, Kansas City Brigade, and Utah Blaze of the Arena Football League (AFL). In 2011, before suffering a career-ending knee surgery, he became the Utah Blaze's all-time leading receiver in all categories including receptions, yards and touchdowns.

High school years
Boone attended Millard High School in Fillmore, Utah, where he was an All-State selection in baseball, basketball and football. In his senior year, he led his team as quarterback to a 2-A state championship title in 1995. Served as student body president.

College career
Boone originally attended Snow College where he was named First-team All-America by the JC Gridwire and All-America by the National Junior College Athletic Association. In two record-setting seasons he compiled 114 receptions, 2,150 receiving yards, and 24 touchdowns. During his sophomore year alone, he averaged 150 receiving yards per game over 10 games, which is the highest of any receiver in a single season in the history of the NJCAA.

In 2001, Boone then committed to play at the University of Kentucky. As a junior in 2001 he recorded 18 receptions for 268 yards and six touchdowns. As a senior in 2002, he recorded 41 receptions for 706 yards and 10 touchdowns. In 2002, during the game leading up to the "Bluegrass Miracle", he recorded three touchdown passes from quarterback Jared Lorenzen.

In 2014, Boone was a member of the inaugural Snow College Athletic Hall of Fame.

Professional career

National Football League/NFL Europe
After going undrafted in the 2003 NFL Draft, Boone signed with the Dallas Cowboys in 2003. In December 2003, he was signed by the Chicago Bears and then allocated to NFL Europe where he played for the Berlin Thunder. He recorded 13 receptions for 221 yards and four touchdowns. Berlin finished the season with a record of 9–1 and defeated the Frankfurt Galaxy 30–24 in World Bowl XII. He was cut during final cuts for the 2004 season.

In 2005, Boone signed with the Carolina Panthers and was again allocated to the Berlin Thunder. He played in 10 regular season games and recorded 43 receptions, 582 yards, and five touchdowns. He helped the team to a berth in World Bowl XIII. After the NFL Europe season, he returned to the Carolina Panthers and spent time with the Panthers until he suffered a season ending shoulder injury.

Arena Football League
Boone joined the Philadelphia Soul in 2006. Later that season, he was traded to the Kansas City Brigade, where he was named to the AFL All-Rookie team. He recorded 66 receptions for 748 yards and 19 touchdowns.

Utah Blaze
In 2007, Boone signed with the Utah Blaze, where he played in only seven games, due to an early season ankle injury. For the season he recorded 32 receptions for 420 yards and eight touchdowns. In 2008, Boone completed his second year with the Blaze recording 135 receptions, 1,527 yards and 23 touchdowns.

In 2010, Boone recorded a career-best season, earning him All-Arena honors. He played in 16 games where he led the Blaze in all receiving statistical categories. Boone finished with 146 receptions for 1,448 yards and 46 touchdowns. This was the second straight season Boone had recorded over 135 receptions, 1,400 yards and 25 touchdowns. During a nationally televised game (NFL Network) versus the Milwaukee Iron on May 14, Boone scored a franchise best seven touchdowns in one game.

In 2011, was on pace to break the AFL single season receiving records in receptions, yards and touchdowns until halfway through the season when he suffered a career ending knee injury. Prior to the injury, Boone did become the All-Time Utah Blaze franchise leading wide receiver in all categories including receptions, yards and touchdowns.

Personal
Boone is the sixth of 10 children, five boys and five girls. He is from an athletic family; his father played football at BYU, his younger brothers Jesse and Jason both were star offensive lineman for Utah, they both went on to play professionally as well. His older sister Amy played basketball and volleyball at George Mason University as well as semi-pro basketball for the San Diego Wave of the NWBL.

Boone and his wife, Lindsay, currently reside in Heber City, Utah and have four young children; Kaiya, Dawson, Rowen and Easton. Boone is a member of the Church of Jesus Christ of Latter-day Saints. He also spends time as a motivational speaker to schools, civic and church groups, and those in hospitals.

See also
 List of National Football League and Arena football players

References

External links
 
 Kentucky Wildcats bio

1978 births
Living people
American football wide receivers
Snow Badgers football players
Kentucky Wildcats football players
People from Fillmore, Utah
Latter Day Saints from Utah
American Mormon missionaries in Peru
Dallas Cowboys players
Chicago Bears players
Berlin Thunder players
Philadelphia Soul players
Kansas City Brigade players
Utah Blaze players
Sportspeople from Provo, Utah
People from Heber City, Utah